"Long After I'm Gone" is a song co-written and recorded by American country music artist Big Kenny, one-half of the duo Big & Rich. The song was released to country radio on August 18, 2009 as his debut single as a solo artist, where it debuted at number 57 on the U.S. Billboard Hot Country Songs chart that week. It is the lead-off single to his second studio album, The Quiet Times of a Rock and Roll Farm Boy, which was released on November 10, 2009, via Love Everybody/Bigger Picture.  Big Kenny wrote this with Marc Beeson and Richard Supa.

Content
"Long After I'm Gone" is a mid-tempo where the male narrator looks back on his life, stating a desire to leave behind a legacy of love.

Critical reception
Juli Thanki of The9513 gave the song a thumbs-up. She said Big Kenny is practicing what he preaches in the lyrics about leaving love as a legacy, and that it's having a positive impact, also saying, "Big & Rich may have legions of adoring fans, but if this is the music representative of what Kenny Alphin can release as a solo artist, then he might just be better off staying away from his bandmate." Bobby Peacock of Roughstock gave a favorable review, saying that the lyrics used "overused platitudes" but that Kenny "injects charisma and passion into every single line. It's very easy to tell that he believes what he's singing[.]"

Music video
A music video was released in August 2009, directed by Christian Holiday and Big Kenny. This video was shot at Big Kenny's house.

Chart performance
"Long After I'm Gone" debuted at number 57 on the U.S. Billboard Hot Country Songs chart for the chart week of August 18, 2009. It has since become his first solo Top 40 hit peaking at number 34 in November 2009.

References

2009 debut singles
2009 songs
Big Kenny songs
Songs written by Big Kenny
Songs written by Marc Beeson
Bigger Picture Music Group singles
Songs written by Richard Supa